Tarun Ghosh is a Bangladeshi art director and animation editor. He won Bangladesh National Film Award for Best Art Direction for the film Kittonkhola (2000).

Selected films

Animation editor
 Nirontor - 2006

Art director
 Kittonkhola - 2000
 Naroshundor - 2009

Awards and nominations
National Film Awards

References

External links
 

Bangladeshi art directors
Best Art Direction National Film Award (Bangladesh) winners
Living people
Year of birth missing (living people)